is a town located in Sorachi Subprefecture, Hokkaido, Japan.

As of September 2016, the town has an estimated population of 11,262, and a density of 67 persons per km2. The total area is 168.36 km2.

References

External links

Official Website 

Towns in Hokkaido